Karen Ruth Keesling (July 9, 1946 – July 4, 2012) was the United States Assistant Secretary of the Air Force (Manpower & Reserve Affairs) from 1988 to 1989.

Biography

Karen R. Keesling was born in Wichita, Kansas on July 9, 1946.  She was educated at Arizona State University, receiving a B.A. in 1968 and an M.A. in 1970.

Keesling was Assistant Dean of Women at the University of Kansas for 1971–72. From 1972 to 1975, Keesling worked in the Department of Health, Education, and Welfare as executive secretary of the Secretary's Advisory Commission on Rights and Responsibilities of Women.  From 1975 to 1977, she was Director of the White House Office of Women.  She was then a women's rights analyst in the Library of Congress's Civil Rights Division.  She then attended the Georgetown University Law Center, receiving her J.D. in 1981.  From 1979 to 1981, she was also a legislative aide of Sen. Nancy Landon Kassebaum (R–Kan.)

In 1981, Keesling joined the United States Department of the Air Force, serving as Deputy for Equal Opportunity and Director of Equal Employment Opportunity, 1981–82; as Deputy Assistant Secretary of the Air Force for Manpower Resources and Military Personnel, 1982–83; Principal Deputy Assistant Secretary of the Air Force for Manpower, Reserve Affairs, and Installations, 1983–87; and as Principal Deputy Assistant Secretary of the Air Force for Readiness Support, 1987–89.

On September 7, 1988, President of the United States Ronald Reagan nominated Keesling to be Assistant Secretary of the Air Force (Manpower & Reserve Affairs).  She held this position until 1989.

In the early 1990s, she joined the United States Department of Labor, serving as Acting Administrator of the Wage and Hour Division.

She moved to Sun City, Arizona in 2000 and practiced law there until her retirement in 2009.  She died July 4, 2012 in Sun City.

References

1946 births
2012 deaths
United States Air Force civilians
People from Wichita, Kansas
Arizona State University alumni
University of Kansas faculty
Georgetown University Law Center alumni
United States Department of Health and Human Services officials
United States Department of Labor officials
Women in the United States Air Force
People from Sun City, Arizona